Zigira is a genus of moths in the subfamily Arctiinae. It was first described by Francis Walker in 1865. It contains the single species Zigira quadrata, which is found in Colombia.

References

Arctiinae
Moths described in 1865